Thoopterus (Latin meaning: ״flying Jackal״) is a genus of megabat. It has two species:
Swift fruit bat (Thoopterus nigrescens)
Suhaniah fruit bat (Thoopterus suhaniahae)

Prior to 2012, it was considered to consist of only one species (T. nigrescens).

References

Megabats
Taxa named by Paul Matschie